Amèle El Mahdi, born in 1956 in Blida, is an Algerian professor of mathematics and writer. She lived in many of the cities in southern Algeria, which inspired many of her writings. She has written for the Algerian newspaper El Watan.

Literary works 
 The Beauty and the Poet, Algiers, Casbah Editions, 2012, 187 p.
 Yamsel, son of the Ahaggar, Algiers, Casbah Editions, 2014, 275 p.
 Tin Hinan, My Queen, Algiers, Casbah Editions, 2014, 141 p.
 Grandma's Beautiful Stories, Algiers, Casbah Editions, 2015
 Under the flag of Raïs, Algiers, Casbah Editions, 2016
 An African odyssey. The tragedy of illegal migration, Algiers, Casbah Editions, 2018, 172 p.
 A collective work entitled Hiziya My Love with texts by 14 novelists and poets (Amar Achour, Nassira Belloula, Maïssa Bey, Aicha Bouabaci, Slimane Djouadi, Saléha Imekraz, Abdelmadjid Kaouah, Azzedine Menasra, Miloud Khaizar, Fouzia Laradi, Amèle El Mahdi, Arezki Metref, Lazhari Labter, Smail Yabrir), Hibr Editions.
 Oasis: yesterday's images, today's views; a collective work supported by the publication program of the French Institute of Algeria. Chihab Editions, 2018

References 

Algerian women writers
Algerian writers
Algerian academics
Algerian mathematicians
Women mathematicians
Algerian journalists
1956 births
Living people
People from Blida
21st-century Algerian people